Rivals.com (stylized as rivals) is a network of websites that focus mainly on college football and basketball recruiting in the United States. The network was started in 1998 and employs more than 300 personnel.

History
Rivals.com was founded in 1998 by Jim Heckman in Seattle, Washington, with a cadre of outside investors. Heckman was once the son-in-law of Don James, the former head football coach at the University of Washington, where Heckman attended school and was later involved in a recruiting scandal.  Initial deriving revenue solely from advertising, Rivals.com later employed a subscription fee of $10.00 per month to users for access to the latest recruiting news and to participate in various message boards dedicated to schools covered by the network. Rivals was funded by money from venture capital firms including the venture funds of Fox and Intel.

Rivals acquired AllianceSports, a regional network that primarily covered college sports in the Southeast of the United States, in January 2000.  At its peak, Rivals.com employed close to 200 people, operated a network of 700 independent websites, filed for an initial public offering worth $100 million led by Goldman Sachs, and sponsored the Hula Bowl in Hawaii.  However, economic troubles and the collapse of the dot-com "bubble" soon led the Rivals Network, the parent company of Rivals.com, to cease operations in 2001, though it never sought bankruptcy protection.  Executives from AllianceSports purchased the Rivals.com assets and subsequently relaunched the website.  Heckman, who had been fired as chief executive officer, later started a competitor network named The Insiders, which was later renamed Scout.com and sold to Fox Interactive Media in 2005.

Led by former AllianceSports executive Shannon Terry, Rivals.com became profitable. On June 21, 2007, Yahoo! agreed to acquire Rivals.com.  Terms of the deal were not disclosed, but several sources reported Yahoo! paid around $100 million.

Rivals subscribers automatically have their subscription renewed for a term equal to the original term upon expiration of the then-current term, and continually thereafter, unless the subscriber terminates the subscription by phone at least 48 hours prior to the renewal date.

Schools
The individual collegiate sites at rivals.com can be found here (viewable only from within the United States).

Schools featured at Rivals include all members of the Power Five conferences:
 ACC
 Notre Dame, a football independent and listed as such by Rivals, is a full ACC member in non-football sports.
 Big Ten
 Big 12
 Pac-12
 SEC

Rivals also has sites for all football members of the American Athletic Conference (though not for incoming non-football member Wichita State).

Conferences that have sites for some of their schools include:
 3 from the Atlantic 10. The schools featured all play Division I FCS football.
 8 from the Big East (all except Butler and Providence). The featured schools include two of the conference's three football-sponsoring members (Georgetown and Villanova, which both play FCS football).
 13 members of Conference USA (all except Old Dominion)
 4 from the MAC.
 8 from the MW.
 6 from the Sun Belt.
 3 FBS independents (all except UMass)
 One each from two FCS leagues, the Colonial Athletic Association (James Madison) and Northeast Conference (Robert Morris).

References

External links
Official site

American football websites
College basketball websites
Yahoo!